No. 570 Squadron RAF was a bomber unit active within No. 38 Group RAF as an airborne, bomber support and special operations squadron during World War II.

History
No. 570 Squadron was formed at RAF Hurn on 15 November 1943, equipped with Armstrong Whitworth Albemarles. It was part of No. 38 Group RAF and was engaged in supply dropping missions to French resistance units when it was not training paratroops and glider-towing.

In July 1944 the squadron re-equipped with Short Stirlings, and in September 1944 participated in Operation Market Garden, the ill-fated attempt by the allies to capture the Arnhem bridge, during which time the squadron was engaged in glider towing and supply drops. The squadron also took part in Operation Varsity in March 1945, a major allied airborne offensive across the Rhine.

When the war finished, the squadron transported troops to Norway, and was then assigned to various overseas mail routes prior to disbanding at RAF Rivenhall on 8 January 1946.

Aircraft operated

Squadron bases

Commanding officers

See also
 No. 38 Group RAF
 List of Royal Air Force aircraft squadrons

References

Notes

Bibliography

External links
 World War II 38 Group Squadrons Reunited
 History of No.'s 541–598 Squadrons at RAF Web
 570 Squadron history at MOD site

Aircraft squadrons of the Royal Air Force in World War II
570
Military units and formations established in 1943